A Roadside Mail Box or RMB 
is an artificial address that is created by Australia Post to deliver mail to a rural or remote location. The RMB address allows a sender or recipient of mail to succinctly specify the mail's destination.

Without the RMB system, many intended destinations would otherwise be specifiable only by a series of directions or some other unwieldy, abstract description.

The RMB address functions similarly to a post office box in that it describes an intended addressee with a unique number, but it is different in that it aliases a real physical address rather than a container at a post office.

Location 
RMBs are usually located on the main road, and not on the farm.  Several RMBs might be grouped together.  The boxes themselves are often decorated as animals or birds.

References

Postal system of Australia